The men's sprint at the 1928 Summer Olympics took place at the Olympic Stadium in Amsterdam. There were 18 competitors from 18 nations, with each nation (for the first time) limited to one cyclist. The event was won by Roger Beaufrand of France, the nation's second consecutive and fourth overall victory in the men's sprint. Antoine Mazairac of the Netherlands, the only other nation to have won a gold medal in the event, put the Dutch team on the podium for the third consecutive Games with his silver. Willy Hansen earned Denmark's first medal in the event, with his bronze.

Background

This was the sixth appearance of the event, which has been held at every Summer Olympics except 1904 and 1912. None of the semifinalists from 1924 returned. The favorites included Roger Beaufrand of France and the host nation cyclist Antoine Mazairac, who had finished second at the 1923 and 1925 World Championships.

Austria, Ireland, Spain, and Turkey each made their debut in the men's sprint. France made its sixth appearance, the only nation to have competed at every appearance of the event.

Competition format

This track cycling event consisted of numerous rounds. Each race involved the riders starting simultaneously and next to each other, from a standing start. Because the early part of races tend to be slow-paced and highly tactical, only the time for the last 200 metres of the one-kilometre race is recorded.

The competition began with a preliminary round consisting of six races, with the winner of each advancing to the quarterfinals. The losers of the preliminary round competed in a two-round repechage, with two cyclists qualifying for the finals out of the repechage. Beginning with the quarterfinals, the competition was a single elimination tournament, with a bronze medal match.

Records

The records for the sprint are 200 metre flying time trial records, kept for the qualifying round in later Games as well as for the finish of races.

* World records were not tracked by the UCI until 1954.

No new Olympic record was set during the competition.

Schedule

The first round was interrupted by rain and had to be continued on the second day.

Results
Source:

Round 1

Heat 1

Heat 2

Heat 3

Heat 4

Heat 5

Heat 6

Repechage semifinals

Repechage semifinal 1

Repechage semifinal 2

Repechage semifinal 3

Repechage semifinal 4

Repechage final

Quarterfinals

Quarterfinal 1

Quarterfinal 2

Quarterfinal 3

Quarterfinal 4

Semifinals

Semifinal 1

Semifinal 2

Medal matches

Bronze medal match

Final

References

Track cycling at the 1928 Summer Olympics
Cycling at the Summer Olympics – Men's sprint